Birthday Boy (Spanish: Cumpleañero) is a 2022 Panamanian thriller drama film written and directed by Arturo Montenegro. It was selected as the Panamanian entry in the Best International Film at the 95th Academy Awards, but was not nominated.

Synopsis 
Jimmy celebrates his 45th birthday at the beach house, inviting his close circle of friends over for a weekend full of fun, excess and compromise. Everything is interrupted by Jimmy's confession of wanting to end his life before the party ends.

Cast 

 Albi De Abreu as Jimmy
 Joavany Alvarez as Alex
 Sharo Cerquera as Nicole
 Julia Dorto as Laura
 Gina Faarup Cochez as Detective
 Gaby Gnazzo as Milu

Production 
Arturo Montenegro commented that it took 5 weeks to prepare the location, hence 3 months of pre-production, to finally shoot the film within 4 weeks in the Azuero peninsula and various beaches in the coast of Pedasí, to continue with five months of post-production.

Release 
Birthday Boy premiered in Panamanian theaters on September 15, 2022. With plans for a premiere in the international market at the hands of Onceloops Media.

See also 

 List of submissions to the 95th Academy Awards for Best International Feature Film
 List of Panamanian submissions for the Academy Award for Best International Feature Film

References

External links 
 

2022 films
2022 thriller films
2022 drama films
2022 thriller drama films
Panamanian drama films
Films set in Panama
Films shot in Panama
Films about suicide
Films about parties